Robert Osterloh (May 31, 1918 – April 16, 2001) was an American actor. His career spanned 20 years, appearing in films such as The Dark Past (1948), The Wild One (1953), I Bury the Living (1958) and Young Dillinger (1965).

Biography 

Osterloh was born in Pittsburgh, Pennsylvania, He was the son of Dr. Charles T. Osterloh and Emma Geiselhart Osterloh. As a student at Perry High School, he was president of the student council and the Dramatic Club, and he had the lead in the school's senior play.

An agent discovered Osterloh while he was acting in stock theater. Director Rudolph Maté gave Osterloh his first opportunity in film in 1948, introducing him in The Dark Past, in which he had a supporting role. Osterloh continued his career for 20 years, mainly in the 1950s, playing roles in films such as Illegal Entry (1949), White Heat (1949) (as a gangster killed by gang boss James Cagney), One Minute to Zero (1952), Star in the Dust (1956) and I Bury the Living (1958). In the 1960s, however, he appeared in only a few films such as Young Dillinger (1965) and his last film, Coogan's Bluff (1968).

Osterloh was featured in the pilots for two notable television series: Perry Mason and The Untouchables. Filmed in 1956, "The Case of the Moth-Eaten Mink" aired in 1957 as the 13th episode of the legal drama series starring Raymond Burr; Osterloh played a central role as restaurant proprietor Morey Allen. In "The Scarface Mob", the pilot for The Untouchables that aired on Westinghouse Desilu Playhouse in 1959, Osterloh was a member of the Federal squad led by Eliot Ness (Robert Stack). Osterloh also played roles in TV series including Wagon Train, The FBI, Ironside and Hec Ramsey.

Osterloh was married to Harriet Hughes, whom he met when they served in the Army in England.

Osterloh died at 82 years of age in Los Osos, California.

Filmography 

1948: Incident - James 'Slats' Slattery
1948: The Dark Past - Pete
1949: Criss Cross - Mr. Nelson (uncredited)
1949: I Cheated the Law - Joe Corsi 
1949: The Undercover Man - Emanuel 'Manny' Zanger
1949: City Across the River - Mr. Bannon
1949: The Doolins of Oklahoma - Wichita Smith
1949: Illegal Entry - Agent Crowthers
1949: White Heat - Tommy Ryley (uncredited)
1949: Pinky - Police Officer (uncredited)
1950: Gun Crazy - Hampton Policeman
1950: The Palomino - Sam Drake
1950: Harbor of Missing Men - Johnny
1950: 711 Ocean Drive - Gizzi
1950: A Lady Without Passport - Lt. Lannahan, NYC Cop
1950: Right Cross - Totem, Heldon's Manager (uncredited)
1950: Southside 1-1000 - Albert
1951: The Great Missouri Raid - August
1951: New Mexico - Pvt. Parsons 
1951: The Fat Man - Chuck Fletcher
1951: The Prowler - Coroner
1951: No Questions Asked - Owney
1951: Drums in the Deep South - Sgt. Harper
1951: The Day the Earth Stood Still - Major White (uncredited)
1951: The Well - Wylie
1951: Cave of Outlaws - Blackhack
1952: Red Skies of Montana - Mac, Dispatcher (uncredited)
1952: Mutiny - Faversham 
1952: One Minute to Zero - Maj. Davis 
1952: The Ring - Freddy Jack
1953: The Royal African Rifles - Carney 
1953: Private Eyes - Prof. Damon 
1953: Wicked Woman - Larry Lowry
1953: The Wild One  - Ben 
1954: Riot in Cell Block 11 - The Colonel 
1954: Johnny Guitar - Sam (uncredited)
1955: Seven Angry Men - Lt. Col. Robert E. Lee (uncredited)
1955: An Annapolis Story - Midshipman Laisson
1955: Violent Saturday - Roy (uncredited)
1955: Man with the Gun - Virg Trotter (uncredited)
1956: Invasion of the Body Snatchers - Ambulance Driver (uncredited)
1956: Star in the Dust - Rigdon 
1956: Johnny Concho - Duke Lang 
1956: The Desperados Are in Town - Deputy Sheriff Mike Broome
1956: Hot Cars - George Hayman 
1957: Baby Face Nelson - FBI Agent Johnson 
1958: Fort Massacre - Schwabacker 
1958: The Case Against Brooklyn - Det. Sgt. Bonney
1958: I Bury the Living - Lt. Clayborne 
1959: The Scarface Mob - Tom Kopka (archive footage)
1959: Warlock - Professor  (uncredited)
1960: Inherit the Wind - Sam (uncredited)
1965: Young Dillinger - Federal Agent Baum 
1966: The Oscar - Reporter at Premiere (uncredited)
1967: Warning Shot - Reporter (uncredited)
1968: Rosemary's Baby  - Mr. Fountain (uncredited)
1968: Coogan's Bluff - Deputy (uncredited)

TV 
 1955-57: Hour of Stars: Deadline Decision - Robinson 
 Season 1, Episode 8 - Casey 
 Season 1, Episode 29 - Foreman 
 Season 2, Episode 25 - Benny 
 1958: Wagon Train: The Juan Ortega Story
 1958: Gunsmoke: Hanging Man
Chester's Hanging
 1959: Bonanza: The Diedesheimer Story
 Season 2, Episode 2 - Jarvis 
 Season 3, Episode 32 - Dresslar 
 Season 3, Episode 36 - Dressler 
 The Untouchables:
 Pilot episode (1959) - Agent Tom Kopke  
 Episode in 1961 - Mr. Moon
 1964: The Outer Limits
 Episode "The Children of Spider County"  
 1967: The Felony Squad: The Savage Streets
 U.S. Marshal: The Man Who Lived - Twice Episode, Actor - Baker
 Perry Mason: S1 Ep13 The Case of the Moth Eaten Mink as Morey Allen

References

External links
 

1918 births
2001 deaths
20th-century American male actors
American male film actors
American male television actors
Male actors from Pittsburgh
People from Los Osos, California